Microplia agilis is a species of beetle in the family Cerambycidae. It was described by Audinet-Serville in 1835.

References

Acanthocinini
Beetles described in 1835